State Road 551 (NM 551) is a  state highway in the US state of New Mexico. NM 551's southern terminus is at NM 456 northeast of Folsom, and the northern terminus is at Colorado State Highway 389 (SH 389) at the Colorado/ New Mexico border.

Major intersections

See also

References

551
Transportation in Union County, New Mexico